Remispora is a genus of fungi in the family Halosphaeriaceae. The genus contains six species.

References

External links
Remispora at Index Fungorum

Microascales